The Muslim Teli are members of the Teli caste who follow Sunni Islam. They are found in  India and Pakistan. 

Related to the Muslim Teli are the Ghanchi, a community found in Gujarat, who are also involved in the manufacture of cooking oil. Luhar caste is also found in these countries, where as some oil refineries are considered Telis in saudi arabia (UAE).

History and origin 
The word Teli is derived from the Sanskrit word tailika or tails, which means oil pressed from mustard or sesame. The community are thus manufacturers of mustard or sesame oil. They were among a number of artisan castes, who converted to Islam. They keep the same surname with them as they usually used in Hindu community. In North India, the community speaks Urdu, and its dialects, Awadhi and Khari Boli. In Pakistan, the community speak Punjabi.

Present circumstances

In India 

In India, they are found throughout North India, with concentrations in the states of Uttar Pradesh and Bihar. The community depend on land. Their traditional occupation of oil pressing has now been replaced with the growing of cash crops and business. Many are now successful businessmen. The community perceives itself to be of Shaikh status, as they are converts from Vaishya caste.

In Uttar Pradesh, a majority of Teli are small and medium-sized farmers. Many have benefited from land reforms carried out at Indian Independence, when they were granted ownership of the land they cultivated. The Uttar Pradesh Teli are strictly endogamous, and are further divided into four endogamous groups, the Turkiya, Ikasna, Doasna and Dese. In terms of distribution, the Turkiya are found mainly in Awadh and Varanasi, while the Ikasna and Doasna are found in western Uttar Pradesh. They speak Urdu, as well as dialects of Hindi, and follow the Sunni sect. The Teli live in multi-caste villages, and but occupy their own distinct quarters. .

In Delhi, the Teli are sub-divided into two communities, the Teli proper and the Teli Dhuniya. They live in the neighbourhoods of Phatak Teliya, Phatak Habash Khan, Khirwala Phatak and Borhaiya in Old Delhi. The Delhi Teli are also known as Shaikh Mansuri, and this name has replaced Teli as a self-description. They are now a community of small businessman and traders, although many are still engaged in oil pressing. A good many of the Delhi Teli emigrated to Pakistan, at partition, and now found concentrated in Karachi.

In Bihar, the Muslim Teli (malik) call themselves Turk Teli or Turkia. According to their traditions, the community is descended of Turk soldiers in the armies of Bakhtiyar Khilji, the Muslim conqueror of Bihar. They are found throughout Bihar, and speak Bhojpuri. Like Teli elsewhere, many are now small and medium-sized businessmen, and have been more successful than other Muslim artisans castes in their adoption of the modern market economy.

In Punjab and Haryana, the Muslim Teli, who are known as Malik, were found throughout the state, and spoke Punjabi & Urdu. They were divided along sectarian divisions, with the majority being Sunni and a minority Shia. The community was further divided into three endogamous groups, the Ikasna, Doasna and Asne. These three sub-divisions are further divided into clans or gotras, such as the Olyan, Diyya, Panwar, Chauhan and Mandhar. Hence Teli of Haryana relate to them with rajput gotras. Muslim Teli practiced clan exogamy, and there wa a further restriction on not marrying within the village. Although Muslim, the Teli do practiced a number of Hindu customs, but these are in decline. The community has abandoned its traditional occupation of oil pressing, with a small number now being cultivators. A majority however are agricultural labourers, with other others employed in the construction industry in Delhi. 

Like other Punjabi and Haryanvi Muslims, they were also affected by the partition of India, and moved en masse to Pakistan. Thus leaving no one.

The Teli have traditional communities councils, but they also have a formal communities association, the Mansuri Anjuman. Their traditional communities councils or panchayats are sub-divided into circles, made up of 10 to 20 villages.

In Pakistan 

In Pakistan, there are three distinct communities which form part of the Teli community,  (Pakistan)|Urdu speaking]] community based in Karachi, and the 
Teli Malik and Teli Ranghar Rajput of Punjab.

See also 
 Malak teli
 Muslim Dhobi
 Momin Ansari
 Putliwale

References 

Social groups of Uttar Pradesh
Muslim communities of India
Social groups of Pakistan
Social groups of Punjab, Pakistan
Muslim communities of Uttar Pradesh
Social groups of Bihar
Muslim communities of Bihar